This is a list of television broadcasters which provide coverage of the Scottish Professional Football League (SPFL), the top four levels of competition of football in Scotland.

History
The SPFL was formed in 2013 by a merger of the Scottish Premier League (SPL) and Scottish Football League (SFL). The league inherited media rights arrangements made by the SPL and SFL with Sky Sports and BT Sport. The domestic rights deal was amended in 2014, following the relegation of Edinburgh clubs Hearts and Hibernian to the Scottish Championship.

In 2013, SPFL sold its international broadcast rights in a £20 million, 10-year deal with sports content distributor MP & Silva. As part of this arrangement, in November 2013 a Chinese network PPLive TV agreed to show 58 live SPFL games a season. A deal was agreed in July 2015 for up to 55 SPFL matches to be shown on "mainstream" Chinese television in the following three seasons, as part of the longer-term arrangement made in November 2013. The agreement with MP & Silva was rescinded in August 2018, as it had defaulted on its payments.

In 2018, it was announced that Sky Sports will take over exclusive live rights for the Premiership from the 2020–21 season.

Broadcasters

International

Club online streams
Due to broadcasting restrictions, clubs cannot show games live in the United Kingdom and Republic of Ireland. However, during social distancing restrictions due to the COVID-19 pandemic clubs in the Premiership will be able to broadcast games in the UK and Ireland, as long as they're not already scheduled to be broadcast by Sky Sports.

References